Brooklands is a tram stop and park and ride site on the Altrincham Line of Greater Manchester's light-rail Metrolink system in the Brooklands area of Sale. It opened on 15 June 1992 as part of Phase 1 of Metrolink's expansion.

History

The station was originally opened on 1 December 1859 by the Manchester, South Junction and Altrincham Railway (MSJAR) after Samuel Brooks, a Manchester banker, built an estate of large houses along Brooklands Road. It closed as a British Rail station on 24 December 1991 before reopening as a Metrolink station on 15 June 1992.

In January 1999, Brooklands Station became a Grade II listed building.

Services
Brooklands is on the Altrincham Line, with trams towards Altrincham stopping every 6 minutes during the day, Monday to Saturday, every 12 minutes Monday to Saturday evenings and Sundays. Trams also head towards Manchester and Bury, with the Monday to Saturday daytime service running every 12 minutes each to Piccadilly or Bury, while evening and Sunday journeys run to Piccadilly only.

Service pattern 
10 trams per hour to Altrincham (5 off-peak)
5 trams per hour to Bury (peak only)
5 trams per hour to Piccadilly

Ticket zones 
As of January 2019, Brooklands is located in Metrolink ticket zones 3 and 4.

Connecting bus routes
Brooklands is served hourly by Diamond Bus route 281, which runs from Altrincham to Sale, via Broadheath, Timperley, and Brooklands Road.

See also

Listed buildings in Sale, Greater Manchester

References

Further reading

External links
Brooklands Stop Information
Brooklands area map

Tram stops in Trafford
Former Manchester, South Junction and Altrincham Railway stations
Tram stops on the Altrincham to Bury line
Railway stations in Great Britain opened in 1859
Railway stations in Great Britain closed in 1991
Railway stations in Great Britain opened in 1992
Tram stops on the Altrincham to Piccadilly line
Sale, Greater Manchester
1859 establishments in England